The Men's marathon 1B was a wheelchair marathon event in athletics at the 1988 Summer Paralympics. The race was won by Serge Raymond.

Results

See also
 Marathon at the Paralympics

References 

Men's marathon 1B
1988 marathons
Marathons at the Paralympics
Men's marathons